Østen Østensen (12 August 1878 – 22 December 1939) was a Norwegian rifle shooter competing in the early 20th century. He won three Olympic silver medals and two bronze medals. His first medal was a silver medal in team, free rifle at the 1912 Summer Olympics in Stockholm. At the 1920 Summer Olympics in Antwerp he won silver medals for team, free rifle and team, military rifle, 300 + 600 m and bronze medals in free rifle, three positions and team, small bore rifle.

References

1878 births
1939 deaths
Norwegian male sport shooters
ISSF rifle shooters
Olympic silver medalists for Norway
Olympic bronze medalists for Norway
Olympic shooters of Norway
Shooters at the 1912 Summer Olympics
Shooters at the 1920 Summer Olympics
Olympic medalists in shooting
Medalists at the 1912 Summer Olympics
Medalists at the 1920 Summer Olympics
Sportspeople from Drammen
20th-century Norwegian people